The 1947 Rhode Island State Rams football team was an American football team that represented Rhode Island State College (later renamed the University of Rhode Island) as a member of the Yankee Conference during the 1947 college football season. In its third season under head coach Bill Beck, the team compiled a 3–4 record (1–3 against conference opponents) and finished in fourth place in the Yankee Conference. The team played its home games at Meade Stadium in Kingston, Rhode Island.

Schedule

References

Rhode Island State
Rhode Island Rams football seasons
Rhode Island State Rams football